Adventure is the first album by the New York City alternative rock band Furslide, released in 1998. It was produced by Nellee Hooper.

Critical reception
The Washington Post gave the album a mixed review, writing that singer/guitarist Jennifer Turner "has a strong, expressive rock soprano, and Hooper wraps her songs in a dizzying psychedelic-synth-pop swirl. The problem is the songs, which have neither memorable melodies nor coherent lyrics." The Austin Chronicle called it "an excellent introduction to pop's latest dynamic frontwoman: Jennifer Turner, a thoughtful songwriter who's perhaps the best female guitar hero since Jen Trynin." Spin wrote that it deserves to be a "pop hit."

Singles 
 Over my Head
 Love Song

Track listing
"Over My Head"
"Shallow"
"Skinny Girl"
"Hawaii"
"Bring You Down"
"Love Song" 	
"My Friend's Gallery"
"Today Forever"
"Faith"	
"One Hit Downer"
"Postcard"
"Curious Have Guns" 
"The Cleaning Lady" (hidden track)

References

External links
 

1998 albums
Albums produced by Nellee Hooper
Virgin Records albums